The 2007 Chennai Open was a men's tennis tournament played on outdoor hard courts at the SDAT Tennis Stadium in Chennai in India and was part of the International Series of the 2007 ATP Tour. The tournament ran from 1 January through 8 January 2007. Third-seeded Xavier Malisse won the singles title.

Finals

Singles

 Xavier Malisse defeated  Stefan Koubek 6–1, 6–3

Doubles

 Xavier Malisse /  Dick Norman defeated  Rafael Nadal /  Bartolomé Salvá-Vidal 7–6(7–4), 7–6(7–4)

References

External links 
 Singles draw
 Doubles draw